Old Fort Bay (also Old Fort Bay Club) is a private gated community, club, and former British colonial fort located in northwestern New Providence Island in The Bahamas just east of Lyford Cay.

The clubhouse itself is the site of a fort that was built by the British during the 18th century to fend off pirates. It was then used as a plantation in the 19th century before being won by James Cox Brady, Jr, the father of Nicholas F. Brady in 1920. Following Brady's death, his wife's new husband, C. Suydam Cutting took over the property and filled it with treasures from around the world. The fort was abandoned after the widow's death.

Restoration and development on a private community and club began in 2002 by British businessman Joe Lewis with the Tavistock Group and the New Providence Development Company (NPDCo). It opened a year later. H. Hunter "Terry" White III took over in 2011.

Notable residents
Bec Hewitt
Lleyton Hewitt
Shakira
Shania Twain

Old Fort Bay Town Centre
The Old Fort Bay Town Centre is a shopping plaza located just outside the easternmost gates of Old Fort Bay. It is also the location of Fresh Market.

References

2003 establishments in the Bahamas
Bays of the Bahamas
Forts in the Bahamas
Gated communities
New Providence
Populated places in the Bahamas
Resorts in the Bahamas